The Subatomic Monster (1985) is a collection of seventeen nonfiction science essays  by American writer and scientist Isaac Asimov. It was the eighteenth of a series of books collecting essays from The Magazine of Fantasy and Science Fiction, these being first published between June 1983 and October 1984. It was first published by Doubleday & Company in 1985.

Contents

"The Properties of Chaos" (June 1983)
"Green, Green, Green is the Color ..." (July 1983)
"What Truck?" (August 1983)
"Where All the Sky is Sunshine" (September 1983)
"Updating the Satellites" (October 1983)
"More Thinking about Thinking" (November 1983)
"Arm of the Giant" (December 1983)
"The World of the Red Sun" (January 1984)
"The Subatomic Monster" (February 1984)
"Love Makes the World Go Round!" (March 1984)
"E Pluribus Unum" (April 1984)
"Up We Go" (May 1984)
"The Two Masses" (June 1984)
"The Victorious General" (July 1984)
"Coming Full Circle" (August 1984)
"The Different Years of Time" (September 1984)
"The Different Years of the Universe" (October 1984)

External links
Asimovonline.com

Essay collections by Isaac Asimov
1985 books
Scientific essays
Works originally published in The Magazine of Fantasy & Science Fiction
Doubleday (publisher) books